Penicillium multicolor is an anamorph species of the genus Penicillium which produces alpha-L-fucosidase, tilactase, sclerotiorin, 8-O-Methylsclerotiorinamine, multicolosic acid and isochromophilones.

Further reading

References 

multicolor
Fungi described in 1915